This was the first edition of the tournament.

Carlos Berlocq won the title after Jaume Munar retired trailing 4–6, 6–2, 0–3 in the final.

Seeds

Draw

Finals

Top half

Bottom half

References
Main Draw
Qualifying Draw

Rio Tennis Classic - Singles
2017 Singles